The Beirut Nights are numbers of events that take place from time to time in Beirut, Lebanon. It's usually active in the summer; however, some other festivals might happen in spring or fall. Beirut Central District has been chosen for many times to hold such occasions whereas others preferred to have their "nights" in exquisite bars and nightclubs. The city is known of its huge crowd from different nationalities participating in these events. Over the years, Beirut witness many concerts or performances that include classical music, dance, theatre, opera, jazz, and modern world music.

Many theatre plays have been part of such events by the passage of time like La Comédie Française. On the other hand, highlights of downtown Beirut are considered to be related to youth culture while the Byblos International Festival, the Baalbeck International Festival and the Beiteddine Festival are the base of classical highlights in Lebanon.

The 2000 AFC Asian Cup was also held in Beirut and basically in Camille Chamoun Sports City Stadium which is the most famous in the capital. The National Museum of Beirut is the principal archaeology museum in the country where artistic paintings, statues and Literature are found. The current exhibition numbers 1300 artifacts dating from prehistoric times to the Arab conquest. On 21 May 2008, the opposition ended its sit-in which begun at 1 December 2006 in downtown Beirut; which refreshed the center of the city.

Highlights

After participating in thousands of festivals, Lebanon's Fairuz appeared in 1994 at the Martyrs' Square, Beirut in front of hundreds of crowds. She returned to BIEL in December, 2006, to be a part of a three-day performance.

In 1999, Luciano Pavarotti performed a charity benefit concert in Beirut, to mark Lebanon's reemergence on the world stage after the civil war. The concert held in Beirut was the largest since the end of the war, it was attended by 20,000 people who traveled from countries as distant. It was the tenor's only concert in the Middle East.

In 2004, Mariah Carey made her debut in the Arab world with a concert before thousands of cheering fans in Beirut; she performed her hits "Butterfly", "Hero" and "Dreamlover". The Grammy-winning artist was met with loud cheers and warm applause that night when she appeared on stage at an exhibition and leisure center on the Mediterranean seafront in downtown Beirut. The president's and prime minister's wives were among those who attended Carey's 90-minute concert, and first in the Middle East, organized by the Beiteddine Festival Committee.

Phil Collins was another worldwide celebrity to visit Lebanon on 5 November 2005. Collins was a part of a charity concert for children cancer at BIEL; that went to the Children's Cancer Center Of Lebanon; which treats youngsters with the disease regardless of their ability to pay. This concert was a part of Phil Collins's First Final Farewell Tour.

By the summer of 2005, Tiësto made his first appearance in Lebanon. Three hours into his set he grabbed a Lebanese flag then proceeded to jump around the stage waving it around, sending the crowd into a frenzy. Lebanon waited a long time for Tiësto to perform in Beirut, the anticipation exploded into joy as he played crowd favorites that included Adagio for Strings, Traffic and Forever Today. Tiësto later reappeared at the summer of 2007 in Beirut and Byblos.

On 10 June 2006 rapper 50 Cent and the G-UNIT performed their first concert in the Arab world at the BIEL in the Beirut Central District. It was the biggest concert in the history of Lebanon at that time. The concert was sold out with the cheapest ticket priced 40 and 50 U.S dollars. G-UNIT performed hits such as In Da Club, Candy shop, Just A Lil Bit, and many more. The concert was a great success with thousands of people attending. The after party was held in the Crystal night club in Beirut with Young Buck and DJ Whookid performing.

On 12 April 2008, David Guetta made his way to Beirut at BIEL. Guetta appeared along with his wife Cathy and performed many hits such as "Love Is Gone" and "The World Is Mine". That same year, the Lebanese joint-stock company, Solidere, has made special free concerts for local artists such as Nawal Al Zoghbi, Nancy Ajram, Ragheb Alama, Massari and other upcoming singers from SuperStar and Star Academy Lebanon. The Martyrs' Square is the place where this event happens, which is more known as "The Center of the Stars". Akon was also added to the list on 12 December of the same year, performing at BIEL.

See also

Beirut Central District
Byblos
Beirut International Exhibition & Leisure Center

External links
 
 
 
 Fairuz – Lebanon – Al Mashriq
 Beirut Nights Radio: Eurodance Trance and Mediterranean Music. A Radio that launched the Beirut Nights in the late 90s after the 2 decades "civil war" was over

References
 
 
 

Music festivals in Lebanon
Summer festivals
Summer events in Lebanon